Manuel Dias (born 13 March 1904, date of death unknown) was a Portuguese athlete who competed in the marathon at the 1936 Summer Olympics. He competed for the Portuguese club S.L. Benfica.

References

1904 births
Year of death missing
Portuguese male marathon runners
Athletes (track and field) at the 1936 Summer Olympics
Olympic athletes of Portugal